Seh Tolan or Seh Talan or Sehtolan may refer to:
 Seh Talan, Jahrom
 Sehtolan, Kazerun
 Seh Talan, Rostam
 Seh Tolan, Sepidan